Rehenesh Thumbirumbu Paramba (born 13 February 1993), is an Indian professional footballer who plays as a goalkeeper for Indian Super League club Jamshedpur and India national team.

Career

ONGC
Rehenesh made his professional debut for ONGC in the I-League against Pailan Arrows on 1 December 2012 coming on as a 56th-minute substitute for Bimal Minj after number one goalkeeper Prasanjit Ghosh was red carded.

Rangdajied United
On 14 January 2014 it was announced that Rehenesh has signed for Rangdajied United. He made his debut in the I-League on 11 February 2014 against Churchill Brothers at the Tilak Maidan Stadium in which he started and played the whole match as Rangdajied lost the match 1–0.

Shillong Lajong
On 14 June 2014 it was announced that Rehenesh had signed for Shillong Lajong. Rehenesh represented NorthEast United FC on loan from his parent club Shillong Lajong and was a regular during the 2014 ISL.

NorthEast United FC
In 2015 season of the ISL, although NorthEast United FC missed the semi-final berth, TP Rehenesh emerged as a more skilled and prolific player, making total number of 47 saves, more than any other goalkeeper in the tournament. In 2017, he signed 2-year deal with NorthEast United FC.

East Bengal

Rehenesh twice headed on loan to East Bengal FC from NorthEast United FC, first in 2016 and then in 2017.

Kerala Blasters
In July 2019, TP Rehenesh joined  Kerala Blasters on a one-year deal.

Jamshedpur FC
In September 2020, TP Rehenesh signed for  Jamshedpur FC. He made 54 saves during the season and was one of the best players for the Men of Steel in the Indian Super League 2020-21.

Career statistics

Honours

Jamshedpur
Indian Super League Premiers: 2021–22

India U23
 South Asian Games Silver medal: 2016

References

Indian footballers
1993 births
Living people
Footballers from Kerala
I-League players
ONGC FC players
Mumbai Tigers FC players
Rangdajied United F.C. players
Shillong Lajong FC players
Indian Super League players
NorthEast United FC players
East Bengal Club players
Rehenesh TP
Association football goalkeepers
Chirag United Club Kerala players
Jamshedpur FC players
India youth international footballers
India international footballers
South Asian Games silver medalists for India
South Asian Games medalists in football